Events in the year 2019 in Chad.

Incumbents
President: Idriss Déby

Events

Sport

The 2019 LINAFOOT is the 31st season of the Chad Premier League
19 to 31 August – Chad competes at the 2019 African Games in Rabat.

Deaths

13 June – Bourkou Louise Kabo, politician (b. 1934).
15 September – Lol Mahamat Choua, politician, President (b. 1939).
31 December – Djimrangar Dadnadji, politician, Prime Minister (b. 1954).

References

 
2010s in Chad
Years of the 21st century in Chad
Chad 
Chad